Seobit is a former Tongva-Gabrieleño Native American settlement in Los Angeles County, California.  It was located along the San Gabriel River, likely near present-day Norwalk, California.

References

Former settlements in Los Angeles County, California
Former Native American populated places in California
Former populated places in California
Tongva populated places